Epacris franklinii is a species of flowering plant in the heath family, Ericaceae, and is endemic to Tasmaina. It is an erect, spreading shrub with lance-shaped or elliptic leaves and white, tube-shaped flowers.

Description 

Taxonomy and naming 
Epacris franklinii was first formally described in 1857 by Joseph Dalton Hooker in The botany of the Antarctic voyage of H.M. Discovery ships Erebus and Terror. III. Flora Tasmaniae from specimens collected on the banks of the Franklin River in Macquarie Harbour by Ronald Campbell Gunn.

Distribution and habitat 
This epacris grows on the banks of the Meander, Mersey, Pieman, Maxwell, Gordon, Franklin and King River systems in north-western Tasmania where it is periodically inundated.

References 

franklinii
Endemic flora of Tasmania
Taxa named by Joseph Dalton Hooker
Plants described in 1857